The men's 100 metres event at the 1974 British Commonwealth Games was held on 25 and 26 January at the Queen Elizabeth II Park in Christchurch, New Zealand.

Medalists

Results

Heats
Held on 25 January

Qualification: First 3 in each heat (Q) and the next 1 fastest (q) qualify for the semifinals.

Wind:Heat 1: -0.1 m/s, Heat 2: +1.4 m/s, Heat 3: +1.4 m/s, Heat 4: +1.0 m/s, Heat 5: +2.0 m/s

Semifinals
Held on 26 January

Qualification: First 4 in each semifinal (Q) qualify directly for the final.

Wind:Heat 1: +1.3 m/s, Heat 2: +0.8 m/s

Final
Held on 26 January

Wind: +0.8 m/s

References

Semifinals results

Athletics at the 1974 British Commonwealth Games
1974